Miriam Scheib (born 5 June 1975) is a German former footballer who played as a forward. She made one appearance for the Germany women's national team.

Career
Scheib earned her first and only international cap for Germany in a friendly on 27 August 1996 against the Netherlands. She came on as a substitute at the start of the second half, with the match finishing as a 3–0 win.

Career statistics

International

References

External links
 
 

1975 births
Living people
German women's footballers
Germany women's international footballers
Women's association football forwards
1. FC Saarbrücken (women) players
Hamburger SV (women) players
Frauen-Bundesliga players
2. Frauen-Bundesliga players
German women's football managers
Female association football managers